Amyl acetate (pentyl acetate) is an organic compound and an ester with the chemical formula CH3COO[CH2]4CH3 and the molecular weight 130.19g/mol. It is colorless and has a scent similar to bananas and apples. The compound is the condensation product of acetic acid and 1-pentanol.  However, esters formed from other pentanol isomers (amyl alcohols), or mixtures of pentanols, are often referred to as amyl acetate. The symptoms of exposure to amyl acetate in humans are dermatitis, central nervous system depression, narcosis and irritation to the eyes and nose.

Uses

 It is used as a flavoring agent, as a paint and lacquer solvent, and in the preparation of penicillin.
 It is an inactive ingredient in liquid bandages.
 It is used as a fuel in the Hefner lamp.

See also 

 Isoamyl acetate, also known as banana oil.
 Esters, organic molecules with the same functional groups
 As a solvent

References

Flavors
Acetate esters